Albert Richard "Jack" Dore (23 May 1875 – 19 December 1937) was an Australian rules footballer who played with Geelong in the Victorian Football League (VFL).

Notes

External links 

1875 births
1937 deaths
Australian rules footballers from Victoria (Australia)
Geelong Football Club players
People educated at Geelong Grammar School